The FIDE World Chess Championship 2002 was held in Moscow, Russia. The first six rounds were played between 27 November and 14 December 2001, and the final match started on 16 January and ended on 23 January 2002. The Ukrainian Grandmaster Ruslan Ponomariov, aged 18, won the championship and became the youngest FIDE World Champion.

Background
At the time of this championship, the World title was split. The Classical World Champion, Vladimir Kramnik, did not participate, as well as the previous Classical Champion and world's highest-rated player, Garry Kasparov. However, all other strongest players of the world took part, including the top seed and winner of the previous FIDE World Championship Viswanathan Anand.

Playing conditions
The championship was a knockout tournament similar to other FIDE World Chess Championships between 1998 and 2004: the players were paired for short matches, with losers eliminated. The field of 128 participants was reduced to one winner over seven rounds.

Rounds 1–5 consisted of a two-game match, followed by tie breaks at faster time controls if required. The time control for regular games was 75 minutes for the first 40 moves and 15 minutes for the rest of the game, with 30 seconds added after each move. Tie breaks consisted of two rapid chess games (20 minutes each + 10 seconds per move); followed by two blitz games if required (5 minutes + 10 seconds per move); followed by a single Armageddon chess game if required (white has 6 minutes and must win, black has 5 minutes and only needs to draw). The semifinals (round 6) were best of four games, and the final was best of eight games, with the same conditions for the tie-breaks.

In addition to previous criticisms of the knockout format (see FIDE World Chess Championship 1998#Controversies), this tournament was criticised by Garry Kasparov for using a faster time control, which Kasparov claimed was lowering the standard of the games.

Participants
All players are Grandmasters unless indicated otherwise.

 , 2797
 , 2744
 , 2739
 , 2731
 , 2730
 , 2719
 , 2714
 , 2711
 , 2706
 , 2704
 , 2702
 , 2699
 , 2695
 , 2695
 , 2695
 , 2692
 , 2690
 , 2686
 , 2684
 , 2677
 , 2675
 , 2675
 , 2674
 , 2669
 , 2667
 , 2659
 , 2655
 , 2652
 , 2651
 , 2650
 , 2646
 , 2642
 , 2639
 , 2638
 , 2633
 , 2630
 , 2630
 , 2630
 , 2629
 , 2628
 , 2627
 , 2627
 , 2627
 , 2625
 , 2624
 , 2618
 , 2614
 , 2614
 , 2613
 , 2610
 , 2609
 , 2608
 , 2605
 , 2604
 , 2604
 , 2602
 , 2602
 , 2600
 , 2599
 , 2599
 , 2598
 , 2598
 , 2595
 , 2594
 , 2593
 , 2591
 , 2589
 , 2588
 , 2588
 , 2587
 , 2585
 , 2581
 , 2580
 , 2579
 , 2578
 , 2574
 , 2573
 , 2573
 , 2573
 , 2573
 , 2572
 , 2571
 , 2570
 , 2566
 , 2564
 , 2558
 , 2557
 , 2556, IM
 , 2555
 , 2554
 , 2551, IM
 , 2550
 , 2549
 , 2548
 , 2537
 , 2533
 , 2533
 , 2532
 , 2531, IM
 , 2530
 , 2529
 , 2527
 , 2522
 , 2517, IM
 , 2509
 , 2508
 , 2506
 , 2499
 , 2495
 , 2494, IM
 , 2492
 , 2487, IM
 , 2487
 , 2481
 , 2477, IM
 , 2471, IM
 , 2464, IM
 , 2462, IM
 , 2461, IM
 , 2442, IM
 , 2425, IM
 , 2415, IM
 , 2400, IM
 , 2373, IM
 , 2348, IM
 , unrated, no title
 , 2357, FM
 , 2382, IM

Qualification
Players qualified for the championship according to the following criteria:
four semi-finalists of the previous championship (Viswanathan Anand, Alexei Shirov, Michael Adams, Alexander Grischuk);
the World Junior Champion 2000 (Lázaro Bruzón);
20 best rated players (the average of July 2000 and January 2001 rating lists was used);
90 qualifiers from the continental championships;
eight qualifiers from the Internet championship;
five nominees of the FIDE President.

Schedule
There was one rest day during round 4 and two rest days during round 6. The tie-breaks of rounds 1–5 were played in the evening following the second game. The final took place one month after rounds 1–6.

Round 1: 27 November 2001, 28 November 2001 (tiebreaks on 28 November 2001)
Round 2: 29 November 2001, 30 November 2001 (tiebreaks on 30 November 2001)
Round 3: 1 December 2001, 2 December 2001 (tiebreaks on 2 December 2001)
Round 4: 3 December 2001, 5 December 2001 (tiebreaks on 5 December 2001)
Round 5: 6 December 2001, 7 December 2001 (tiebreaks on 7 December 2001)
Round 6: 8 December 2001, 10 December 2001, 11 December 2001, 13 December 2001 (tiebreaks on 7 December 2001)
Round 7: 16 January 2002 – 24 January 2002, with a rest day on 20 January 2002 (tiebreaks on 25 January 2002)

Results, rounds 1-4

Section 1

Section 2

Section 3

Section 4

Section 5

Section 6

Section 7

Section 8

Results, rounds 5-7

{{8TeamBracket
| RD2=Semifinals (best of 4)
| RD3=Final (best of 8)
| RD1-seed1=1
| RD1-team1= Viswanathan Anand
| RD1-score1=1½
| RD1-seed2=9
| RD1-team2= Alexei Shirov
| RD1-score2=½
| RD1-seed3=4
| RD1-team3= Vasyl Ivanchuk
| RD1-score3=3½
| RD1-seed4=21
| RD1-team4= Joël Lautier
| RD1-score4=2½
| RD1-seed5=15
| RD1-team5= Peter Svidler
| RD1-score5=3½
| RD1-seed6=7
| RD1-team6= Boris Gelfand
| RD1-score6=2½
| RD1-seed7=19
| RD1-team7= Ruslan Ponomariov
| RD1-score7=3
| RD1-seed8=6
| RD1-team8= Evgeny Bareev
| RD1-score8=1
| RD2-seed1=1
| RD2-team1= Viswanathan Anand
| RD2-score1=1½
| RD2-seed2=4
| RD2-team2= Vasyl Ivanchuk
| RD2-score2=2½
| RD2-seed3=15
| RD2-team3= Peter Svidler
| RD2-score3=1½
| RD2-seed4=19
| RD2-team4= Ruslan Ponomariov
| RD2-score4=2½
| RD3-seed1=4
| RD3-team1= Vasyl Ivanchuk
| RD3-score1=2½
| RD3-seed2=19
| RD3-team2= Ruslan Ponomariov
| RD3-score2=4½
}}

Championship final

{| class="wikitable" style="text-align:center"
|+World Chess Championship Final 2002
|-
! !! Rating !! 1 !! 2 !! 3 !! 4 !! 5 !! 6 !! 7 !! Points
|-
| align=left |  || 2684| 1 ||style="background:black; color:white"| ½ || ½ ||style="background:black; color:white"| ½ || 1 ||style="background:black; color:white"| ½ || ½ || 4½'''
|-
| align=left |  || 2731
|style="background:black; color:white"| 0 || ½ ||style="background:black; color:white"| ½ || ½ ||style="background:black; color:white"| 0 || ½ ||style="background:black; color:white"| ½ || 2½
|}

References

External links
World Chess Championship, 2001-02 FIDE Knockout Matches

2002
2001 in chess
2002 in chess
Chess in Russia
2001 in Russian sport
2002 in Russian sport
2001 in Moscow
2002 in Moscow